The 1965–66 Montreal Canadiens season was the team's 57th season of play. The Canadiens won the Stanley Cup for the second consecutive season, and the 14th time in their history. Bobby Rousseau registered 78 points and tied with Stan Mikita for second in the overall 1965–66 NHL scoring race.

Regular season

Final standings

Record vs. opponents

Schedule and results

Playoffs

Finals

With this series, Toe Blake had coached the Canadiens to seven Stanley Cup championships in eleven years. Henri Richard, a member of all seven, would score the series winner in overtime of game six. Despite the Wings losing, their goalie Roger Crozier would win the Conn Smythe Trophy.

Detroit Red Wings vs. Montreal Canadiens

Montreal wins Stanley Cup four games to two.

Player statistics

Regular season
Scoring

Goaltending

Playoffs
Scoring

Goaltending

Milestones
November 1965: Henri Richard got his 600th career point
January 1966: Richard would earn his 400th career assist
Jean Beliveau would play in his 800th career game during the season.
During the season, Beliveau would become the first Canadiens player to accumulate 500 career assists.

Draft picks
Montreal's draft picks at the 1965 NHL Amateur Draft held at the Queen Elizabeth Hotel in Montreal, Quebec.

See also
1965–66 NHL season
List of Stanley Cup champions

References

External links
Canadiens on Hockey Database
Canadiens on NHL Reference

Stanley Cup championship seasons
Montreal Canadiens seasons
Mon
Mon